Rick Donnelly (born May 17, 1962 in Miller Place, New York) is a former punter in the National Football League. He played for the Atlanta Falcons and the Seattle Seahawks. He was an All-Pro in 1987 and 1988. He led the NFL in punts in 1988 with 98.

1962 births
Living people
People from Miller Place, New York
American football punters
Wyoming Cowboys football players
Atlanta Falcons players
Seattle Seahawks players
Players of American football from New York (state)